Coquette Productions is a film and television production company founded by Courteney Cox and David Arquette in June 2004. The company is located in Los Angeles, California.

The company name is a portmanteau of Cox's and Arquette's surnames.

Filmography

Television
 Mix It Up (2003)
 Talk Show Diaries (2005)
 Daisy Does America (with Warner Bros. Television) (2005)
 Dirt (with FX Productions, Matthew Carnahan Circus Products, Touchstone Television and ABC Studios) (2007–2008)
 Cougar Town (with Doozer and ABC Studios) (2009–2015)
 Celebrity Name Game (with Entertain the Brutes, Green Mountain West Inc., CBS Television Studios and Fremantle North America) (2014–2017)

Film
 Bigger Than the Sky (with Neverland Films) (2005)
 Slingshot (2005)
 The Tripper (with Raw Entertainment) (2007)
 The Butler's in Love (with Le Tourment Vert and Bischoff Hervey Entertainment) (2008)
 The Big Change (2009)
 Just Before I Go (with New Artists Alliance) (2014)

References

Mass media companies established in 2004
Film production companies of the United States
Television production companies of the United States